Kasan Soleh (born 6 November 1982 in  Pasuruan, Indonesia) is an Indonesian footballer who currently plays for Persema Malang.

Career 

The defender played for Persekabpas Pasuruan, before join in summer 2008 to  Persema Malang.

References

Indonesian footballers
Living people
1982 births
Association football defenders
Persema Malang players
People from Pasuruan
Sportspeople from East Java